César Luís Prates (born 8 February 1975) is a Brazilian retired footballer who played as a right back.

He was known for his powerful free kicks, and played for 15 clubs during his extensive professional career in five countries, his biggest spell being four years with Sporting Clube de Portugal, where he won four major titles.

Football career
Born in Aratiba, Rio Grande do Sul, Prates started his career at Sport Club Internacional, where his steady performances attracted the attention of Real Madrid. He never made it, however, past its reserves, and initiated a series of loan moves in the subsequent seasons, almost always in Brazil.

In January 2000, Prates arrived (still on loan) alongside two other players to Sporting Clube de Portugal. All would be instrumental as the Lions ended an 18-year drought and conquered the Primeira Liga championship, and the move was made permanent subsequently.

Prates earned a lucrative deal in the 2003 summer with Turkey's Galatasaray SK, but could not settle at his new club, and moved after a few months to Figueirense Futebol Clube. After an impressive stint at Botafogo de Futebol e Regatas he moved overseas again, joining A.S. Livorno Calcio and being first-choice as the club finished sixth and reached the UEFA Cup.

In January 2007, Prates stayed in Italy and its Serie A, joining A.C. ChievoVerona and signing a two-year contract. Released in June he returned to his country, representing several sides until his retirement in 2010, aged 35.

Honours
Internacional
Campeonato Gaúcho: 1994

Vasco
Campeonato Brasileiro Série A: 1997

Corinthians
Campeonato Brasileiro Série A: 1999

Sporting
Primeira Liga: 1999–2000, 2001–02
Taça de Portugal: 2001–02
Supertaça Cândido de Oliveira: 2000, 2002

Figueirense
Campeonato Catarinense: 2008

References

External links

1975 births
Living people
Brazilian footballers
Association football defenders
Campeonato Brasileiro Série A players
Campeonato Brasileiro Série B players
Sport Club Internacional players
CR Vasco da Gama players
Coritiba Foot Ball Club players
Botafogo de Futebol e Regatas players
Sport Club Corinthians Paulista players
Figueirense FC players
Clube Atlético Mineiro players
Associação Portuguesa de Desportos players
Joinville Esporte Clube players
Clube Náutico Capibaribe players
Segunda División players
Real Madrid Castilla footballers
Primeira Liga players
Sporting CP footballers
Süper Lig players
Galatasaray S.K. footballers
Serie A players
U.S. Livorno 1915 players
A.C. ChievoVerona players
Brazil international footballers
Brazilian expatriate footballers
Expatriate footballers in Spain
Expatriate footballers in Portugal
Expatriate footballers in Turkey
Expatriate footballers in Italy
Brazilian expatriate sportspeople in Portugal
Brazilian expatriate sportspeople in Turkey
Brazilian expatriate sportspeople in Italy